The Lugbara are a Central Sudanic ethnic group who live primarily in the West Nile region of Uganda, in the adjoining area of the Democratic Republic of the Congo (DRC) with a few living in South Sudan. They speak the Lugbara language, a Central Sudanic, Nilotic language similar to the language spoken by the Madi, with whom they also share many cultural similarities. The Lugbara are famed for their beauty, tenacity and craftsman ship.

Traditions and culture

Traditionally, the Lugbara are farmers who rear some livestock and poultry, mainly Guineafowl locally known as 'ope'. They are the predominant keepers of guinea fowl in Uganda. Lugbara occupy the West Nile region of Uganda and Arua, Arua City, Maracha, Terego, Madi-Okollo, Yumbe and Koboko districts of Uganda to be specific. The Lugbara are divided into many dialects which are easily understandable to each other. These include; Ayivu, Maracha, Terego, Vurra and Aringa. Tribes related to the Lugbara in language include Madi and Keliko in South Sudan.

In the early days, the Lugbara were a mainly chiefdom based community. They did not have kingdoms and kings presiding over them as like other ethnic groups in Uganda. They mainly had chiefs who were their leaders. They formed friendly alliances with neighbouring chiefdoms so as to ensure their security against attacks from other ethnic groups. The earlier Lugbara did not have soldiers or a standing army in their chiefdoms. Every able bodied man had the duty to protect his village hence all able bodied men were automatically considered a soldier though this was not a permanent duty. The Lugbara were originally animists as their mythology attests. However Christianity is now the predominant religion amongst them today with Islam another major religion.

They are settled subsistence farmers. Cassava is now the traditional staple. They also grow millet, sorghum, legumes, pigeon peas, beans and a variety of root crops. Before cassava was introduced to the Lugbara to manage famine when the cereal [millet and sorghum] failed due to drought in the 1960s, millet and sorghum used to be their staple food. Chicken, pigs, goats, and at higher elevations, cattle are also important. Groundnuts, simsim [sesame], chick peas and sweet potatoes are also grown. Maize is grown for brewing beer, and tobacco is an important cash crop. New emerging crops are avocado, pineapple, and mangoes.

In early days of 1874 the North Eastern side of the Democratic Republic of Congo, a faction of the Lugbara were called "The Naked People", due to their attitude towards clothing.  Most women did not wear shirts and many of them did not wear even dresses, but they were covered with grass skirts or leaves.  Taller than many Congolese, the Lugbara men are great hunters as well, using powerful bows with long arrows that have fishing hooks type tips.

This ethnic group straddles the common border between Uganda and the Democratic Republic of Congo with the majority of their population in the Congo side of the border. Some live in South Sudan.

A collection of the proverbs of the Lugbara have been published, and also a description of how their proverbs relate to ethics. The same author has described other parts of traditional Lugbara customs and society.

Famous and well known Lugbara include Dorcus Inzikuru, the 3000-metre steeple chase world champion in Helsinki 2005 and Jackson Asiku, the previous Commonwealth boxing light-weight champion. Another important Lugbara is John Munduga, an international boxer. Idi Amin Dada's mother Aisha Aate is said to belong to the Okapi/Lenya Clan of the Lugbara tribe in the D R Congo.

The cultural symbol of the Lugbara is a leopard with 300 spots.

See also
 Lugbara cuisine
 Lugbara language
 Lugbara mythology
 Lugbara proverbs

References

Further reading
 Middleton, J. (1965). The Lugbara of Uganda. Case studies in cultural anthropology. New York: Holt, Rinehart and Winston. 2nd edition published 1992, Fort Worth : Harcourt Brace Jovanovich College Publishers, .

Idi Amini is the first president of the Uganda from West Nile

External links
 Lugbara entry from Ethnologue

 
Lugbara
Ethnic groups in the Democratic Republic of the Congo
Ethnic groups in Uganda